Phillip's Wish is a television programme aimed at children, broadcast on the BBC,
produced for BBC Kids World & The Britt Allcroft Company by Hibbert Ralph Entertainment.

External links
  CBeebies – Phillip's Wish at bbc.co.uk

BBC children's television shows
British television shows featuring puppetry